Nikola Milosavljevic (born 24 April 1996) is a Swiss footballer who plays for AC Bellinzona on loan from FC Sion.

References

1996 births
Living people
Swiss men's footballers
Swiss Super League players
Swiss Challenge League players
Swiss Promotion League players
FC Lugano players
FC Chiasso players
FC Sion players
FC Winterthur players
AC Bellinzona players
Swiss people of Serbian descent
Association football midfielders